James Wasserstrom is a US diplomat who currently serves as an anti-corruption officer at the US embassy in Kabul.

UN "whistleblower"
He was posted to the UN mission in Kosovo to fight corruption but in 2007 he witnessed misconduct involving UN officials and a local utility company. He later reportedly uncovered evidence that two senior UN officials had received bribes for awarding a contract for the building of a coal fired power plant and mine. After complaining to the UN's oversight office his job was effectively abolished and he was investigated for misconduct. Wasserstrom then went to the UN's Ethics Office where it was eventually ruled that he was maltreated but that this did not count as retaliation against a whistleblower.

After a lengthy legal battle, documents backing his version of events were uncovered and the UN's Dispute Tribunal overturned the original decision. Whilst a judgement was not made on the alleged corruption in the UN's Kosovo mission, it was decided that the UN's original evidence was conflicted and that the mechanisms for dealing with whistleblowers within the UN were fundamentally flawed. United Nations Secretary General, Ban Ki-moon had refused to hand over confidential documents relating to the case to the UN personnel tribunal, despite repeated orders by the tribunal to do so.

Wasserstrom has been critical of the pace of reform in the UN and also of Secretary General, Ban Ki-moon for allegedly undermining support for whistleblowers by trying to limit the jurisdiction of the UN dispute tribunal.

References

Year of birth missing (living people)
Living people
American diplomats
American whistleblowers
American officials of the United Nations